Albrecht Heinz Erhard Glaser (born 8 January 1942 in Worms, Germany) is a German politician. From 1997 until 2001 he served as the treasurer of Frankfurt.

Education and personal life
Glaser studied at the Heidelberg University, the University of Tübingen and the German University of Administrative Sciences, Speyer.

Glaser is in his second marriage and has four children.

Politics
Glaser joined the CDU in 1970. As a local politician he was Mayor of Bretten, and later from 1980 to 1987 of Waldbronn.

From 1995 he was on the city Council of Frankfurt, and in 1997 took on the position of city treasurer.

In the 16th Federal Convention (2017) he was the AfD's candidate for President of Germany. He received 42 out of 1,253 electoral votes on the first ballot and finished third behind Frank-Walter Steinmeier (SPD, 931 votes) and Christoph Butterwegge (The Left, 128 votes).

In the 2017 German federal election he was elected as member of the Bundestag. On 27 September 2017 the AfD-group announced, it would propose Glaser as candidate for Vice President of the Bundestag. However, after three rounds of voting, he could not secure the required majority.

References 

1942 births
Living people
People from Worms, Germany
People from Rhenish Hesse
Christian Democratic Union of Germany politicians
Members of the Bundestag for Hesse
Heidelberg University alumni
University of Tübingen alumni
Candidates for President of Germany
Members of the Bundestag 2017–2021
Members of the Bundestag for the Alternative for Germany
Members of the Bundestag 2021–2025